'Avrom Landy, (AKA "A. Landy", 1904–1992), was a historian, writer and theorist on American Marxism in the first half of the twentieth  century. He was the father of the American artist and researcher, the artist Professor Emeritus of the School of the Art Institute of Chicago, Sonia Landy Sheridan.

Background 
Landy was born in Cleveland Ohio and received a B.A. from Ohio State University and Master of the University of Wisconsin, Madison. Ph.D. in history,  philology, the philosophy of language, at Madison University.

Career
At that time he was appointed to the Daily Worker as editor.  He was city editor for the Daily Worker for about two years in the early 1930s. He was co-publisher of International Publishers from 1945 until about 1947, when he left the Communist Party.  Landy was an influential Marxist thinker during the 1930s and 1940s, especially through his educational and editorial work, and also through his articles in various leftist journals.

He became educational director of the Communist Party of America, a position he held until 1945. He was the Communist Party candidate for New York State Senate 4th District in 1941.

He taught at both Phi Beta Kappa- Ohio State University and The University of Wisconsin.

Landy orientated his daughter Sonia to become a translator in global politics, and he hired her to do the French research for his new book "The United States and the Paris Commune of 1871". His daughter  tried to get “The Paris Commune” by A. Landy published in London, England, but it was rejected. Later she got Landy's book “The Paris Commune” published in Paris in “La Pensee."

With the four time election of President Franklin Roosevelt,  Landy joined Earl Browder, head of the CPUSA, in believing that the USA was on its own historical destiny, a democratic mix of socialism and capitalism.

Legacy 
His archives and documents are at the Northwestern University library “A.Landy Collection" and at the Langlois Foundation, along with his daughter  Sonia Landy Sheridan archives in the Sonia's Langlois Foundation Generative Systems records in Montreal, Canada.

Works

Books
 Marxism and the Democratic Tradition, ASIN: B0014JWIXI, (New York: International Publishers, 1946),
 Marxism and the Woman Question (New York: Worker's Library, 1943).

Articles
 "A Year of American Slav Unity," The Communist (1943)

References 

1904 births
1992 deaths
Writers from Cleveland
20th-century American male writers
American Marxist historians
Marxist feminists
Scholars of Marxism
Ohio State University alumni
University of Wisconsin–Madison alumni
20th-century American newspaper editors
Members of the Communist Party USA
Historians from Ohio